The following highways are numbered 3C:

United States
 New York State Route 3C (former)
 Nevada State Route 3C (former)

See also
 List of highways numbered 3